Carmenta guyanensis is a moth of the family Sesiidae. It was described by Ferdinand Le Cerf in 1917, and is known from Brazil, French Guiana, Bolivia, and Peru.

References

Sesiidae
Moths described in 1917